Wright Station is situated on the Puffing Billy Railway, Melbourne, Australia.

It opened on 24 October 1904 as part of the Gembrook railway line. It served the Wright Forest and small township of Avonsleigh, and consisted of only a small Mallee shed and a name board.

When the Gembrook line was officially closed on 30 April 1954, the site fell into disrepair, and by the 1990s, little trace of Wright remained. However, by that time, efforts were being made to extend the railway to the entire length of the original line from Lakeside through to Gembrook. Wright was officially re-opened on 18 October 1998, but a replica of the original shed was not rebuilt until sometime later.

Trains do not normally stop at Wright.

External links
 Melway map at street-directory.com.au

Tourist railway stations in Melbourne
Railway stations in the Shire of Yarra Ranges